Tiere bis unters Dach is a German television family series. As of October 2021, it consists of 104 episodes in eight seasons and is produced by regional German television channel SWR Fernsehen for the national broadcaster organization ARD (broadcaster). The first episode aired on January 16, 2010.

Plot
The series revolves around 10-year-old Greta Hansen and her family and friends. The Hansen family moves from the big city of Hamburg to a rural Black Forest village, and while 7 year old Lilie quickly settles in her new surrounding, Greta has a hard time adjusting to her new life at first. Her father Philip and mother Annette also struggle to settle in. Arranging the run down house they've moved into, establishing their new veterinarian practice, dealing with the villagers' skeptical reception - all this is a bit of a challenge for everyone.

Gradually though, Greta begins to make new friends and to experience all kinds of smaller and bigger adventures with them. These adventures all have one thing in common: rescuing animals. Greta is a great animal lover and unfailingly keeps supporting their needs and interests, against all odds and obstacles.

Jonas, practical and inventive son of mayor and local farmer Grieshaber, becomes her special friend and ally - together with even-tempered Celine who grows into a loyal partner in all of Greta's adventures. Bitchy and plotting Emma is giving Greta and her friends a hard time quite often, but even she has to acknowledge Greta's audacity and boldness from time to time...

In the third season, the focus shifts to a new set of characters, as Greta's cousin Nelly Spieker moves into town and makes friends with the Polish kids Pavel and Paulina. At school, she has to contend with the bullies Gustav and Big Ben.

In the fourth season, a new character, Jessie, is introduced, and Greta Hansen returns.

In the fifth season, the mother Annette goes back to Hamburg to care for her sick mother, putting strain on the household.

Cast

See also
List of German television series

External links

 
 

2010 German television series debuts
Television series about animals
German-language television shows
Das Erste original programming